Eoreuma morbidellus is a moth in the family Crambidae. It was described by Harrison Gray Dyar Jr. in 1913. It is found in Guyana.

References

Haimbachiini
Moths described in 1913